One of the Bravest is a 1925 American silent action drama film directed by Frank O'Connor and starring Ralph Lewis, Edward Hearn, and Pat Somerset.

Plot
A father of Irish heritage rejects his firefighter son when he marries and Jewish girl, and wrongly suspects him of being a coward.

Cast

Preservation
A complete print of One of the Bravest is held by the Library of Congress.

References

Bibliography
 Munden, Kenneth White. The American Film Institute Catalog of Motion Pictures Produced in the United States, Part 1. University of California Press, 1997.

External links

1925 films
1925 drama films
American silent feature films
1920s action drama films
American action drama films
American black-and-white films
Films directed by Frank O'Connor
Gotham Pictures films
1920s English-language films
1920s American films
Silent American drama films
Silent action drama films